Alyaksey Martynets (born 13 March 1985) is a Belarusian former professional footballer.

Career
Born in Minsk, Martynets began playing football in FC Smena Minsk's youth system. After the club was incorporated into FC Minsk, he joined the senior team and made his Belarusian Premier League debut in 2007.

References

External links

1985 births
Living people
Belarusian footballers
Association football midfielders
FC Minsk players
FC Smorgon players
FC Torpedo-BelAZ Zhodino players
FC Granit Mikashevichi players
FC Gorodeya players